Doxanthrine is a synthetic compound which is a potent and selective full agonist for the dopamine D1 receptor. Doxanthrine has been shown to be orally active in producing contralateral rotation in the 6-hydroxydopamine rat model of Parkinson's disease.

References 

Catechols
D1-receptor agonists